Espe is a small river of Hesse, Germany. It flows into the Fulda northeast of Kassel.

See also

List of rivers of Hesse

Rivers of Hesse
Rivers of Germany